The Russian occupation of Sumy Oblast was a military occupation that began on 24 February 2022, when Russian forces invaded Ukraine and began capturing parts of the Sumy Oblast.  The capital of the Oblast, Sumy, was never captured by Russian forces, however, other cites were captured including Konotop and Trostianets. On 6 April, Russian forces left the oblast, ending its military occupation.

Occupation

Konotop 
On 25 February, Russian forces captured the city of Konotop,  from the Russian border.

On 2 March, Artem Seminikhin, the mayor of Konotop, stated that Russian forces in the city warned him that they would shell the city if the residents resisted them. Russian vehicles, deployed outside the City Council, were surrounded by locals. Seminikhin asked the residents of the city whether they wanted to fight or surrender, whereupon the residents "overwhelmingly" refused to surrender. Later in the day, city authorities negotiated with Russian forces, with talks lasting 12 minutes. An agreement was reached under which Russian forces accepted not to change the city's government, deploy troops in the city, obstruct transportation, or remove the Ukrainian flag. In return, the city officials agreed that the residents would not attack Russian forces.

On 7 March, the Ukrainian General Staff assessed that Russian forces at Konotop had taken 50 percent losses and were forced to regroup and resupply. On 15 March, Ukrainian and Russian forces agreed to open a humanitarian corridor to evacuate citizens from Konotop. On 28 March, Russian forces destroyed a bridge in Konotop.

On 2 April, it was reported that the Russian army maintained a corridor in Konotop Raion through which equipment from Kyiv and Chernihiv could be withdrawn to Russia. On 3 April, Ukrainian MP  stated on Twitter that all Russian forces had left Konotop Raion. On 4 April 2022 Sumy Oblast's Governor Dmytro Zhyvytskyi stated that Russian troops no longer occupied any towns or villages in Sumy Oblast and had mostly withdrawn, while Ukrainian troops were working to push out the remaining units.

On 5 April, Governor Zhyvytsky stated that the bodies of at least three tortured civilians had been found in the Konotop Raion.

Trostianets 

On 1 March, Russia forces captured the city of Trostianets and began a military occupation of the city.

Military occupation
The Russian military headquarters was established at the town's main train station. In mid-March, some Russian troops were replaced with Russian-supported separatist forces. 

Approximately 800 Russian troops occupied the city. During the occupation, Ukrainian police officers remained in the city incognito, supporting both local civilians and partisan forces operating in the area. Ukrainian forces destroyed a bridge to the south of the city, stalling the Russian advance deeper into Ukraine. The town's mayor, Yuriy Bova, hid in nearby villages, receiving some criticism for his decision not to stay in town, but continued to coordinate Ukrainian resistance, including shelling of Russian positions. Reports of executions of civilians by Russian troops began in early March.

Ukrainian counterattack
A Ukrainian counter-offensive beginning on 23 March recaptured the city by 26 March. During the fighting, the town's hospital was shelled, with residents blaming Russian forces. After combat and shelling around the outskirts of the city, Russian troops largely withdrew overnight before the arrival of Ukrainian forces. An AFP report recorded "a dozen" destroyed or damaged tanks and armored vehicles. The New York Times reported that food had grown scarce by the time the city was recaptured by Ukraine.

On 7 April, Dmytro Zhyvytskyi, governor of Sumy Oblast, said that all Russian troops had left the region, but it was still unsafe due to rigged explosives and other ammunition Russian troops had left behind.

Control of cities

See also 

 Russian-occupied territories of Ukraine
 Russian occupation of Crimea
 Russian occupation of Chernihiv Oblast
 Russian occupation of Donetsk Oblast
 Russian occupation of Kharkiv Oblast
 Russian occupation of Kherson Oblast
 Russian occupation of Kyiv Oblast
 Russian occupation of Luhansk Oblast
 Russian occupation of Mykolaiv Oblast
 Russian occupation of Zaporizhzhia Oblast
 Russian occupation of Zhytomyr Oblast
 Snake Island during the 2022 Russian invasion of Ukraine
 Annexation of Crimea by the Russian Federation
 Russian annexation of Donetsk, Kherson, Luhansk and Zaporizhzhia oblasts

References 

Sumy
February 2022 events in Ukraine
March 2022 events in Ukraine
April 2022 events in Ukraine
Sumy
History of Sumy Oblast
Konotop